A passport is a travel document.  The term may also refer to:

Passport may also refer to:

Automobiles
 Passport (automobile dealership), a Canadian car dealership owned by General Motors
 Passport Optima, a rebranded version of the automobile Opel Kadett
 Honda Passport, a sport utility vehicle

Entertainment
 Passport (1961 film), a Bollywood film
 Passport (1983 film), Indian Malayalam film
 Passport (1990 film), Russian film
 Passport (2012 film), Indian Bengali film
 Passport (album), a 2011 album by Pascal & Pearce
 Passport (band), a jazz fusion band
 Passport (1976), an album by Nana Mouskouri
 "Passport" (instrumental), by Charlie Parker (1950)
 Passport Records, a U.S.-based independent record label that existed between 1973 and 1988
 "Passport", a song by Circa Waves from their 2019 album What's It Like Over There?
 "Passports", a song by Reks from his 2012 album REBELutionary

Other
 Passport (company), a mobile payment platform
 Passport, Illinois, an unincorporated community in Richland County, Illinois
 Passport Inns, a brand of Hospitality International
 BlackBerry Passport, a BlackBerry smartphone
 My Passport, the brand name of a series of external hard drives made by Western Digital
 Passport, a summary of qualifications, as in European Language Passport

See also
 Henley Passport Index, a global ranking of countries according to the travel freedom of holders of their ordinary (non-diplomatic) passport holders